The 134th New York Infantry Regiment was an infantry regiment in the Union Army during the American Civil War.

Service
The 134th New York Infantry was organized at Schoharie, New York beginning July 9, 1862 and mustered in for three years service on September 22, 1862 under the command of Colonel George E. Danforth.

The regiment was attached to 2nd Brigade, 2nd Division, XI Corps, Army of the Potomac, to October 1863, and Army of the Cumberland to April 1864. 2nd Brigade, 2nd Division, XX Corps, Army of the Cumberland, to June 1865.

The 134th New York Infantry mustered out of service June 10, 1865. Recruits and veterans were transferred to the 102nd New York Volunteer Infantry.

Detailed service
Left New York for Washington, D.C., September 25, 1862. Joined XI Corps at Fairfax Court House, Va., October 2, 1862, and duty there until November 1. Movement to Warrenton, then to Germantown November 1–20. March to Fredericksburg, Va., December 10–15. At Falmouth until April 27, 1863. "Mud March" January 20–24. Chancellorsville Campaign April 27-May 6. Battle of Chancellorsville May 1–5. Gettysburg Campaign June 11-July 24. Battle of Gettysburg July 1–3. Pursuit of Lee July 5–24. At Bristoe Station to September 24. Movement to Bridgeport, Ala., September 24-October 3. March along line of Nashville & Chattanooga Railroad to Lookout Valley October 25–29. Reopening Tennessee River October 26–29. Battle of Wauhatchie, Tenn., October 28–29. Chattanooga-Ringgold Campaign November 23–27. Orchard Knob November 23. Tunnel Hill November 24–25. Missionary Ridge November 25. March to relief of Knoxville November 27-December 17. Duty in Lookout Valley until May 1864. Atlanta Campaign May 1-September 8. Demonstration on Rocky Faced Ridge May 8–11. Dug Gap or Mill Creek May 8. Battle of Resaca May 14–15. Near Cassville May 19. New Hope Church May 25. Battles about Dallas, New Hope Church, and Allatoona Hills May 26-June 5. Operations about Marietta and against Kennesaw Mountain June 10-July 2. Pine Hill June 11–14. Lost Mountain June 15–17. Gilgal or Golgotha Church June 15. Muddy Creek June 17. Noyes' Creek June 19. Kolb's Farm June 22. Assault on Kennesaw June 27. Ruff's Station, Smyrna Camp Ground, July 4. Chattahoochie River July 6–17. Peachtree Creek July 19–20. Siege of Atlanta July 22-August 25. Operations at Chattahoochie River Bridge August 26-September 2. Occupation of Atlanta September 2-November 15. Expedition from Atlanta to Tuckum's Cross Roads October 26–29. Near Atlanta November 9. March to the sea November 15-December 10. Siege of Savannah December 10–21. Carolinas Campaign January to April 1865. Averysboro, N.C., March 16. Battle of Bentonville March 19–21. Occupation of Goldsboro March 24. Advance on Raleigh April 9–14. Occupation of Raleigh April 14. Bennett's House April 26. Surrender of Johnston and his army. March to Washington, D.C., via Richmond, Va., April 29-May 20. Grand Review of the Armies May 24.

Detailed Timeline with Commands

Assault on Kennesaw Mountain 
The 134th was organized under XX Corps (Hooker), 2ND DIV. (Geary), 2ND BRIG. (Jones).  The 134th was part of the frontal assault .  Placed at the front of Brig. Gen. John W. Geary troops under COL Patrick H. Jones.  The 134th assaulted just west of Dead Angle".

Casualties
The regiment lost a total of 122 men during service; 2 officers and 41 enlisted men killed or mortally wounded, 1 officer and 78 enlisted men died of disease.

Commanders
 Colonel George E. Danforth
 Colonel Charles R. Coster
 Colonel Allan H. Jackson - commanded at the Battle of Gettysburg while still at the rank of lieutenant colonel

See also

 List of New York Civil War regiments
 New York in the Civil War

References
 Conklin, George W. Under the Crescent and Star: The 134th New York Volunteer Infantry in the Civil War (Port Reading, NJ: Axworthy Pub.), 1999. 
 Cosgrove, Charles H. A History of the 134th New York Volunteer Infantry Regiment in the American Civil War, 1862-1865: Long Night's Journey Into Day (Lewiston, NY: E. Mellen Press), 1997. 
 Dyer, Frederick H. A Compendium of the War of the Rebellion (Des Moines, IA: Dyer Pub. Co.), 1908.
 Jones, Kenneth M. "Never forsake the flag": The Letters of Capt. Geo. A. Turnbull, Capt. Co. A, 134th N.Y. Vols. (S.l.: s.n.), 1998.
 Levy, William T. The Blue and the Gray: A Sketch of Soldier Life in Camp and Field in the Army of the Civil War (Schenectady, NY: R. B. Myers), 1904. [Reprinted in 2008 as The Civil War Memoir of William T. Levey ]
Attribution

External links
 Guidons of the 134th New York Infantry
 134th New York Infantry monument at Gettysburg Battlefield
Desperate Stand: What The Brickyard Fight Meant At Gettysburg
The Civil War Diaries of George Rolfe, 134th New York

Military units and formations established in 1862
Military units and formations disestablished in 1865
Infantry 134